The ServInt Corporation is a provider of managed virtual private servers, dedicated web hosting services and open proxies, based in Reston, Virginia, United States.

ServInt provides hosting services to tens of thousands of sites all over the world.

History 
ServInt was founded by Reed J. Caldwell in 1995. When it moved out of a college dorm in 1995, the company had one employee, a $10,000 family loan, some student credit cards, and a single Pentium-90 Web server running Linux 1.2.9.  ServInt grew and became known as one of the first web-hosting companies to offer a managed, dedicated server solution.  It went on to build a private network that came close to achieving Tier 1 status, lacking only domestic Sprint peering.

In subsequent years leading to the Dot Com bust in 2000, ServInt invested heavily in a large-scale, transnational content distribution network. While ambitious, the collapse of the bubble caused interest in the network to wane. The spiraling costs of the network coupled with the sheer number of ServInt clients folding from the collapse forced ServInt to file Chapter 11 Bankruptcy protection in February 2001.

ServInt emerged from bankruptcy protection a few months later, and refocused its staff and resources towards managed web hosting. Since 2002, the company has focused on providing enterprise-level Virtual Private Server (VPS), Cloud hosting and Dedicated server options to its customers from its data centers in Virginia, California and Washington, DC. ServInt has maintained a competitive presence in hosting since their re-emergence.

In December 2010 Netcraft reported that ServInt hosts Wikileaks.

ServInt has been outspoken in its criticism of the Stop Online Piracy Act through former ServInt COO Christian Dawson, who has made multiple public arguments against the bill.

ServInt was acquired by Leaseweb USA on May 8, 2018.

Social media outreach 

On July 7, 2009, competitor Rackspace experienced the first in a series of outages that caused a firestorm across the web. On July 8, ServInt's CEO, Reed Caldwell, posted a defense of Rackspace's handling of the outages on the ServInt Source, the company's corporate blog. The defense was a response to what Caldwell felt was "disingenuous poaching" on the part of a rival webhost, OnlineTech. Though the host was not mentioned by name in the post, the backlash was tangible, and OnlineTech's CEO Yan Ness issued a personal response.

ServInt's use of social media and focus on ethical competition was widely acknowledged as a boon for the company. Author and social media blogger Shel Israel referred to Caldwell's message as "lethal generosity".  The incident also spurred an ongoing conversation about the validity and ethics behind "rescue" marketing.

Services and partners
ServInt's primary services provide clients with managed virtual private servers, dedicated web hosting services, and open proxies. The company partners with several organizations to deliver additional products, including Jelastic, MySQL, Apache, Symantec, and WordPress. ServInt was the first web host to launch a Jelastic Platform-as-a-Service cloud offering.

Locations 
ServInt's corporate offices are located in Reston, Virginia, just outside the District of Columbia.  It maintains two US-based CoreSite data centers in Northern Virginia 12100 Sunrise Valley Dr, Reston, VA 20191, one in Los Angeles, California 624 S Grand Ave. Suite 110 Los Angeles, CA 90017. Most of these data centers are leased via CoreSite.

In June 2012, ServInt opened an international data center in Amsterdam. Its opening was the second major expansion, after opening their LA data center, and it represents their first data center presence outside of North America.

References 

Companies established in 1995
Companies based in McLean, Virginia